Otto Boeddicker (1853–1937) was a German astronomer. He published drawings of naked-eye observations of the Milky Way in 1892, made over a period of six years. He also observed the Moon, including the emitted heat during a total eclipse of the Moon.

In 1880 he became the astronomical assistant of Lawrence Parsons, 4th Earl of Rosse at Birr Castle in Birr, Ireland, and remained in that position until the death of the Earl in 1908.  He left for Germany in 1916 after being designated an enemy alien.

A crater on Mars is named in his honor.

References

1853 births
1937 deaths
20th-century German astronomers
19th-century German astronomers